Festivali i Këngës 11 (Albanian for the "11th Song Festival") took place from 22 to 25 December 1972 in Tirana, Albania, and was organized and produced by Albanian Public Radio and Television (RTSH). The Albanian dictator of the time, Enver Hoxha, perceived the organizers of the event to be "Enemies of the Public", a name given to all the subjects who he considered a danger to the country. Many of them were subsequently murdered after being accused of endangering the country's mentality by introducing an immoral aspect to the show, and plotting against the government by influencing the Albanian youth. The claims were out of context and these murders were used as an example and a statement for future organizers. Skifter Këlliçi talks more extensively about this historic event in his book Festivali i Njëmbëdhjetë (The 11th festival).

The Singers 
Lefter Agora
Justina Aliaj
Bashkim Alibali
Iliriana Çarçani
Petrit Dobjani
Valentina Gjoni
Liliana Kondakçi
Sherif Merdani
Dorian Nini
Shkëlqim Pashollari
Suzana Qatipi
Ema Qazimi
Françesk Radi
Zija Saraçi
Ilmi Sino
Lindita Sota (Theodhori)
Tonin Tërshana
Vaçe Zela

References

 
1972
1972 music festivals